Walter Abish (December 24, 1931 – May 28, 2022) was an Austrian-born American author of experimental novels and short stories. He was conferred the PEN/Faulkner Award for Fiction in 1981 and was awarded a MacArthur Fellowship six years later.

Early life
Abish was born in Vienna on December 24, 1931. His family was Jewish. His father, Adolph, worked as a perfumer; his mother was Friedl (Rubin). At a young age, he fled with his family from the Nazis, traveling first to Italy and Nice before living in Shanghai from 1940 to 1949. In 1949, they relocated to Israel, where Abish served in the army and developed an interest in writing. He settled in the United States in 1957 and became an American citizen three years later.

Career
Abish published his first novel, Alphabetical Africa, in 1974. The book, whose first and last chapters employ only words starting with the letter "A", was characterized by Richard Howard in The New York Times Book Review as "something more than a stunt, though a stunt it is." 

This was followed by his first collection of stories, Minds Meet, a year later, with one story envisaging Marcel Proust in Albuquerque. His second collection, In the Future Perfect, was released in 1977 and utilized words juxtaposed in unusual patterns to form alphanumeric games. Writing in The Tennessean, Alfred Sims noted that, as in Abish's previous work, "Here again the old war horses of plot and narrative line are sacrificed in favor of reflections on the nature and use of language." 

Abish was conferred a literature fellowship by the National Endowment for the Arts in 1979. He published a second novel, How German Is It, the following year. Recognized as his most celebrated work, it garnered him the PEN/Faulkner Award for Fiction in 1981. Of Abish's prose, the PEN/Faulkner judges (William H. Gass, Tim O'Brien , Elizabeth Hardwick) said: "It helps keep the American novel alive in its time. The prose of this novel is as cold as snow in a storm and as driven."

He also received a Guggenheim Fellowship (1981) and a MacArthur Fellowship (1987), and sat on the contributing editorial board of the literary journal Conjunctions. Abish's third collection, 99: the New Meaning, was released in 1990 as a "limited edition of five collagist stories". 

His last novel, Eclipse Fever (1993), received mixed reviews, with James Atlas describing its protagonist in The Times Book Review as "even for a literary critic, something of a bore". But Will Self, reviewing the book in The Independent, wrote: "Abish, unlike a populist film maker, doesn't simply produce snapshots to be passed among the mass. He tears treasured portraits from our culture's family album and thrusts them into his cunning slide carousel. Clicking from one page to the next, we reflect not on the death of literary fiction but on its vitality."  

Abish worked and taught at Empire State College, Wheaton College, University at Buffalo, The State University of New York, Columbia University, Brown University, Yale University, and Cooper Union. He also served on the board of International PEN from 1982 to 1988. He was on the board of governors for the New York Foundation for the Arts. Abish was elected a Fellow of the American Academy of Arts and Sciences in 1998.

Personal life
Abish married Cecile Gelb, a photographer and sculptor, in 1953. They remained married until his death. They did not have children.

Abish died on May 28, 2022, at Mount Sinai Beth Israel in Manhattan at 90 years old.

Bibliography
 Duel Site – poetry, 1970
 Alphabetical Africa – novel, 1974 
 Minds Meet – story collection, 1975 
 In the Future Perfect – story collection, 1977 
 How German Is It (Wie deutsch ist es) – novel, 1980 
 99: The New Meaning – story collection, 1990 
 Eclipse Fever – novel, 1993 
 Double Vision: A Self-Portrait – memoir, 2004

Awards
 1972 – Fellow of New Jersey State Council on the Arts
 1974 – Rose Isabel Williams Foundation grant
 1977 – Ingram Merrill Foundation grant
 1979 – Fellow of National Endowment for the Arts
 1981 – Guggenheim fellowship
 1981 – CAPS grant
 1981 – PEN/Faulkner Award for Fiction
 1985 – Fellow of National Endowment for the Arts How German Is It
 1987 – Fellow of German Academic Exchange Service
 1987 – MacArthur Fellows Program
 1991 – American Academy and Institute of Arts and Letters Award of Merit Medal for the Novel
 1992 – Lila Wallace – Reader's Digest Fund fellowship

References

External links 

 "Sentimental Re-Education", John Updike, The New Yorker, February 2004

1931 births
2022 deaths
20th-century American short story writers
20th-century American male writers
20th-century American novelists
20th-century American poets
Austrian emigrants to Israel
Austrian expatriates in China
Austrian expatriates in Italy
MacArthur Fellows
Israeli emigrants to the United States
Israeli people of Austrian-Jewish descent
American people of Austrian-Jewish descent
Empire State College faculty
Columbia University faculty
Brown University faculty
Cooper Union faculty
Fellows of the American Academy of Arts and Sciences
PEN/Faulkner Award for Fiction winners
American male novelists
American male short story writers
American male poets
Novelists from Connecticut
Novelists from Massachusetts
Novelists from New York (state)
University at Buffalo faculty
Wheaton College faculty
Writers from Vienna
Yale University faculty